"Baknaffek" is a song co-written and performed by American hip hop group Das EFX, issued as the second single from their second studio album Straight Up Sewaside. The song samples "People" by Graham Central Station; "Buffalo Gals" by Malcolm McLaren and the World's Famous Supreme Team; and "Cummin' at Cha" by EPMD. It peaked at #44 on the Billboard rap chart in 1994.

Chart positions

References

External links
 
 

1993 songs
1994 singles
Das EFX songs
East West Records singles